The 2021 Army Black Knights men's lacrosse team represents the United States Military Academy in the 2021 NCAA Division I men's lacrosse season. The Black Knights are led by sixteenth-year head coach Joe Alberici and play their home games at Michie Stadium in West Point, New York. Army competes as a member of the Patriot League.

Previous season
In a season impacted by the COVID-19 pandemic, the Black Knights compiled a 6–2 (2–0 Patriot League) regular season record before the rest of the season was cancelled.

Preseason

Preseason poll
The Patriot League released their preseason poll on February 5, 2021 (voting was by conference head coaches and sports information directors). The Black Knights were picked to finish in second place and garnered four first-place votes.

Preseason All-Patriot League team
The Black Knights had four players picked to the preseason All-Patriot League team, tied for second-most in the conference. Additionally, junior attack Brendan Nichtern was selected as the 2021 Patriot League Men's Lacrosse Preseason Offensive Player of the Year.

Bobby Abshire, Junior, Midfielder
Marcus Hudgins, Junior, Defense
Brendan Nichtern, Junior, Attack
Wyatt Schupler, Junior, Goalie

Roster
The Army men's lacrosse roster as of February 5, 2021:

Standings
Patriot League men's lacrosse was split into two divisions for the 2021 season; a four-team North division and a five-team South division. The top-three teams in both divisions will qualify for the Patriot League Championship tournament held in May. The divisional winner with the best overall winning percentage will earn the right to host the semifinals and finals. The No. 2 and No. 3 seeds from each division will play each other in the quarterfinals, with the winner playing the opposite division's No. 1 seed in the semifinals. Only the first game played against divisional opponents counts towards the division standings.

Schedule

 The game between Holy Cross and Army was originally scheduled for March 20 but was postponed due to a positive Covid-19 test within the Black Knights' Tier 1.
 The game between Colgate and Army was originally scheduled for March 13 but was postponed due to a positive Covid-19 test within the Black Knights' Tier 1.

Schedule Source:

Rankings

References

Army Black Knights men's lacrosse players
Army Black Knights men's lacrosse team
Army Black Knights lacrosse